Carlos Lázaro Vallejo (born 13 November 1990) is a Spanish footballer who plays as a midfielder.

Club career
Although born in Medina del Campo, Lázaro grew up in Olmedo (also located in Valladolid), where he began to play football. Aged 12, he joined Real Valladolid's youth system and played his first seasons with the reserves, suffering relegation to the fourth division in his first year.

First-team coach José Luis Mendilibar gave Lázaro his first chance to appear in La Liga, in one of his last games before being sacked: on 17 January 2010, he played the full 90 minutes against Racing de Santander in a final 1–1 away draw. After appearing in six of the following seven matches – three starts, but five defeats – under new manager Onésimo Sánchez, he suffered a serious injury and could not help prevent the Castile and León side's relegation, after a 0–4 loss at FC Barcelona.

For 2010–11, Lázaro was definitely promoted to Valladolid's first team, but made no official appearances whatsoever during the season, due to a bout of hyperventilation and an ankle injury. In April 2012, he was loaned to SD Huesca also in the second level until the end of the campaign, as a replacement for injured David Bauzá.

References

External links

1990 births
Living people
People from Medina del Campo
Sportspeople from the Province of Valladolid
Spanish footballers
Footballers from Castile and León
Association football midfielders
La Liga players
Segunda División players
Segunda División B players
Real Valladolid Promesas players
Real Valladolid players
SD Huesca footballers
Deportivo Alavés players
Hércules CF players
CD Mirandés footballers
Lleida Esportiu footballers
Spain youth international footballers